Tatyana Pavlovna Firova (born October 10, 1982) is a Russian former sprint athlete. She was awarded the silver medal in the 4 × 400 m relay at the 2004 Summer Olympics.

In 2016, it was announced that a reanalysis of samples from the 2008 Summer Olympics resulted in a doping violation by Firova. She was disqualified from the competition, and she and her teammates were stripped of their 4 × 400 m relay silver medals. She claimed that using banned substances was necessary for achieving good results: "A normal person can take banned substances if they want to. So why can't athletes take them as well? How else can we achieve high results?" Although offending athletes are required to return their stripped medals to the IOC, Firova refused to return her medals.

In February 2019, the Court of Arbitration for Sport handed her a four-year ban for doping, starting from 9 June 2016, and all of her results from 20 August 2008 to 31 December 2012 were disqualified.

References

External links

Athlete bio at 2008 Olympics website

1982 births
Living people
Athletes (track and field) at the 2004 Summer Olympics
Athletes (track and field) at the 2008 Summer Olympics
Athletes (track and field) at the 2012 Summer Olympics
Competitors stripped of Summer Olympics medals
Doping cases in athletics
European Athletics Championships medalists
Medalists at the 2003 Summer Universiade
Medalists at the 2004 Summer Olympics
Olympic athletes of Russia
Olympic silver medalists for Russia
Olympic silver medalists in athletics (track and field)
People from Sarov
Russian female sprinters
Russian sportspeople in doping cases
Universiade gold medalists for Russia
Universiade medalists in athletics (track and field)
World Athletics Championships winners
Olympic female sprinters
Sportspeople from Nizhny Novgorod Oblast